Laurits Selmer Swenson (aka Selmer) (June 12, 1865–November 4, 1947) was an American diplomat who served as Ambassador (called Minister at the time) to Norway, the Netherlands, Switzerland and Denmark.

Background
Laurits Selmer Swenson was born in New Sweden, Minnesota to Norwegian immigrant parents. His father, Swen Swenson (1836–1905)  was a Minnesota State Representative.
He graduated from Iowa's Luther College with bachelor's (1886) and master's (1889) degrees and became Principal of Lutheran Academy in Albert Lea, where he worked from 1888 to 1897.  From 1895 to 1897 Swenson served on the University of Minnesota Board of Regents.
Swenson also pursued a business career, serving as Vice President of Union State Bank and President of the Wiprud Land & Colonization Company, an effort to attract European immigrants to settle in Minnesota.

Diplomatic career
In 1897 Swenson started a diplomatic career when he was appointed Minister to Denmark.  He served in Copenhagen until 1905.  In this post Swenson negotiated the terms for the sale of the Danish West Indies (now the U.S. Virgin Islands).

In 1909 he was appointed Minister to Switzerland, where he served until 1911.

Swenson served as Minister to Norway from 1911 to 1913. In 1921 Swenson was again appointed Minister to Norway, and he held this position until 1930.  Swenson was a popular diplomat, particularly in Norway, maybe due to his Norwegian ancestry.  In 1929 Time Magazine wrote: "Europeans have always marveled that the diplomatic and consular representatives of the U. S. are so often of the same strain as the people to whom they are accredited".

In 1925 Swenson received the Nobel Peace Prize in Oslo, on behalf of the US vice president Charles Gates Dawes. The prize was shared with the British secretary of state Austen Chamberlain.

In 1931 Swenson was named Ambassador to the Netherlands, where he served until 1934. He then retired and moved back to Norway where his only daughter lived.

Swenson died in Oslo on November 4, 1947.  He is buried in Lake Prairie, Minnesota's Norseland Lutheran Cemetery.

See also
List of United States political families (S)

References

External resources
Laurits Selmer Swenson biography, Office of the Historian, U.S. Department of State, accessed December 13, 2012

1865 births
1947 deaths
People from Nicollet County, Minnesota
Luther College (Iowa) alumni
Minnesota Republicans
Ambassadors of the United States to Denmark
Ambassadors of the United States to Switzerland
Ambassadors of the United States to Norway
Ambassadors of the United States to the Netherlands
American people of Norwegian descent